"Jenkins" is the 13th episode of the fifth season of the CBS situation comedy How I Met Your Mother and 101st episode overall. It originally aired on January 18, 2010. The episode hit a season high with 10.52 million viewers and high overall ratings.

The episode is directed by starring actor and first-time director Neil Patrick Harris.

Plot
Ted and Marshall walk into a college bar, and Ted is worried about meeting his students there. Marshall goes to the bar often to maintain his skeeball high score. Marshall tells him that Jenkins, a particularly quirky co-worker who has been the subject of a number of funny office stories that Marshall has told the group about, will be joining them. Because Marshall neglected to mention Jenkins's gender, Ted pictures Jenkins as a goofy fat man, and is therefore taken by surprise when Barney announces his intention to sleep with Jenkins. He finally gets the resolution when Jenkins arrives and turns out to be a beautiful woman. Marshall begs Ted not to tell Lily, since he is afraid that she would be jealous when she finds out Jenkins' real gender, since some of the things that Jenkins had done were crazy (peeing out of a cab window, taking off her shirt as she dances on the table, etc).

The next day, Lily unexpectedly shows up at Marshall's workplace, and finds out that Jenkins is a woman. However, she is not jealous or upset that he neglected to tell her Jenkins' gender. Ted and Robin theorize that in every relationship, one person is a "reacher", and one is a "settler", who settles for the less attractive partner. Marshall at first is offended and says that he did not "settle for Lily", but is upset when he realizes that Ted and Robin define him as a reacher. Marshall later asks Lily to classify herself and she says that she is a "settler", upsetting him even more.

To prove that he can date more attractive women, Marshall plans to show Lily how Jenkins flirts with him. At his workplace, Jenkins kisses Marshall on impulse. Marshall runs home and apologizes to Lily, but she dismisses him as lying to make her jealous. Jenkins later apologizes to Marshall, saying she was drunk from a late-night drinking game. She plans to apologize to Lily, which Marshall eagerly urges her to do to prove to Lily that Jenkins really did kiss him. Lily calmly listens to Jenkins' apology, then proceeds to beat her up.

In a separate story, Robin encounters fans of her pre-morning news show. At the college bar, one of Ted's students compliments Robin for her work. The next day, she interrupts Ted's class to announce that she is the show's host. After she leaves, Ted complains about how boring the show is and asks why would his students know her. The class explains to Ted that Robin is so hesitant when she does interviews that her constant interjections of "but um" are the basis for a drinking game, one that Jenkins had been playing when she drunkenly kissed Marshall.

Ted and Barney test the game the next night, watching Robin's show, and get smashed. After Robin brags about her wide viewership, Ted explains the reason. That night, Ted joins his class for the game. Annoyed by the truth, Robin decides to repeat the phrase "but um" excessively, making those playing the game drink much more than usual.

During the next day's class, Robin interrupts again, startling the hungover Ted and his students by shouting into a megaphone.

Production
Neil Patrick Harris made his directorial debut with the episode. This is especially unusual for the show, as Pamela Fryman directed the majority of the episodes before this. Of the previous 100 episodes, 94 were directed by Fryman, 5 were directed by Rob Greenberg and 1 was directed by Michael Shea, making Harris only the fourth different person to direct an episode of the show. Harris summarized the experience describing it as [sic] "Equal parts overwhelm, education, and exhilaration." Harris' role is smaller in this episode due to directorial duties.

Critical response

Donna Bowman of The A.V. Club rated the episode with a grade B+.

Brian Zoromski of IGN gave the episode 8.5 out of 10.

TV Fanatic praised the role of Jenkins by Amanda Peet, while Amos Barshad of Vulture.com praised its humor.

References

External links

How I Met Your Mother (season 5) episodes
2010 American television episodes